Bonnie Tsui (born 1977) is an American author and journalist of Hong Kong descent. She was born in New York, New York, graduated from Harvard University, and currently lives in Berkeley, California. She grew up a competitive swimmer. American Chinatown: A People’s History of Five Neighborhoods was published by Simon & Schuster's Free Press in 2009, and won the 2009-2010 Asian/Pacific American Award for Literature. The Los Angeles Times said it "explored their class struggles, rivalries, customs and dialects," of the cities' Chinatowns. Tsui also contributes essays and cultural commentary to well-known American magazines, including The New York Times and California Sunday.  Her accolades include the 2019 National Press Foundation Fellowship and the Jane Rainie Opel Young Alumna Award at Harvard University. In 2020, she published a memoir, Why We Swim, with Algonquin Books, which delves into the history of swimming. The New York Times called it an enthusiastic and thoughtful work. Her third book, Sarah & the Big Wave, about big-wave women surfers, was published by Henry Holt Books for Young Readers in 2021. She is a member of the San Francisco Writers Grotto.

References

Living people
American women memoirists
American memoirists
1979 births
Writers from San Francisco
American people of Hong Kong descent
American women journalists of Asian descent
Writers from Queens, New York
Harvard University alumni
21st-century American women